Gaius Septimius Severus Aper (c. 175211/212) was a Roman aristocrat.

Life
He was appointed consul ordinarius in 207 with the otherwise unknown Lucius Annius Maximus.

Aper came from Leptis Magna and was probably a paternal grandson of the consul suffectus of July 153, Publius Septimius Aper. Aper is possibly the same person called Afer in the Historia Augusta, who at the end of the year 211 or 212 was executed by the command of the emperor Caracalla.

Severan dynasty family tree

References
 Historia Augusta, "Caracalla", 3.6–7
 Prosopographia Imperii Romani (PIR) ² S 489

Severan dynasty
Septimii
Imperial Roman consuls
2nd-century Romans
3rd-century Romans
2nd-century Punic people
3rd-century Punic people
170s births
210s deaths
Year of birth uncertain
Year of death uncertain